The men's triple jump event at the 1981 Summer Universiade was held at the Stadionul Naţional in Bucharest on 21 and 22 July 1981.

Medalists

Results

Qualification

Qualifying mark: 16.00 m

Final

References

Athletics at the 1981 Summer Universiade
1981